Pikwitonei is a community in Northern Region of Manitoba, Canada. It is located approximately 47 km (29.2 mi) from Thompson. The community is served by Via Rail at the Pikwitonei railway station.

Demographics 

References 

Designated places in Manitoba
Northern communities in Manitoba
Unincorporated communities in Northern Region, Manitoba